Francis Assikinack (18241863) was a 19th-century Ojibwe historian. Assikinack was born on Manitoulin Island.  He was raised learning only Ojibwe and did not learn English until after enrolling at Upper Canada College in 1840. His father Jean-Baptiste Assiginack was a prominent leader of the Ojibwe.

Assikinack had tried to get approval to study medicine but the government did not support him in this course. Assikinack worked for the Canadian Indian department. For a time he taught school at Wikwemikong.

He wrote three essays on the customs and culture of the Ojibwe.

Sources

 
 

1824 births
1863 deaths
Ojibwe people
19th-century Native Americans